Love and Learn is a 1947 American comedy film directed by Frederick de Cordova and written by Eugene Conrad, I. A. L. Diamond and Francis Swann (from a story by Harry Sauber). It stars Jack Carson, Robert Hutton, Martha Vickers, Janis Paige and Otto Kruger. The film was released by Warner Bros. on May 2, 1947.

Plot

Frustrated because they cannot get their songs published, Jingles Collins and Bob Grant decide to leave New York City and return home. On one last night out on the town, joined by Jingles' sweetheart Jackie, they encounter Barbara Wyngate, mistaking her for a dance hostess when she is actually a wealthy young heiress.

Barbara keeps her identity a secret after falling for Bob and pays to have a song published. With assistance from her father, she also gives expensive gifts. Bob at first suspects her to be some kind of kleptomaniac, then spots her father with her and angrily assumes Barbara is a mistress of a much older man.

Refusing to listen to her explanation, Bob becomes so distant that Barbara decides to elope with her boring fiancé Willard against her better judgment. Andrew Wyngate finally explains the truth to Bob and together they hurry to put a stop to the wedding.

Cast  
 Jack Carson as Jingles Collins
 Robert Hutton as Bob Grant
 Martha Vickers as Barbara Wyngate
 Janis Paige as Jackie
 Otto Kruger as Andrew Wyngate
 Barbara Brown as Victoria Wyngate
 Tom D'Andrea as Wells
 Florence Bates as Mrs. Bella Davis
 Craig Stevens as Willard Deckerr
 Angela Greene as Phyllis McGillicuddy
 Don McGuire as Delaney
 John Alvin as William
 Herbert Anderson as Pete
 Jane Harker as Receptionist
 Lou Nova as Marty

Reception
T.M.P. of The New York Times reviewed the film negatively, saying it was "so inept in execution and conception that it is hard to believe it comes from the Warner Brothers studio."

References

External links 
 
 
 
 

1947 films
1947 comedy films
American black-and-white films
American comedy films
Films about music and musicians
Films directed by Frederick de Cordova
Films set in New York City
Warner Bros. films
1940s English-language films
1940s American films